"Mathletics" is the third single by Foals. It peaked at number 109 on the UK singles chart. It was released as a digital download and on vinyl on 20 August 2007. It was recorded and mixed by producer Gareth Parton at the Fortress and Strongroom recording studios. The song was used in promotional advertisements on the UK channel Fiver. The track received generally positive reviews.

Although initially released as a non-album single, it was added as a bonus track to later editions of Foals's debut album, Antidotes.

Track listing

References

External links
Official website

2007 singles
Foals songs
2007 songs
Songs written by Yannis Philippakis
Transgressive Records singles